is one of the seven mat holds, Osaekomi-waza, of Kodokan Judo, a variation of Kami shiho gatame. In grappling terms, it is categorized as a north-south hold.

Technique description 
Executing the Kuzure-kami-shiho-gatame is similar to Kami shiho gatame, which involves pinning the opponent's arms to his or her side, typically by grabbing the opponent's belt and using the arms to press the arms of the opponent inwards. The difference between the two is instead of one or both arms of the opponent being pinned to the side, they are controlled for instance by pinning them in between an upper arm and a knee. Thus the 'broken' attribute for which the technique is named.

In The Canon Of Judo, Kyuzo Mifune states that tori should stay on his toes with knees off the mat.

Escapes 
 Ebi (Shrimp) Kami-Shiho-Gatame Escape
 Circling Bridge/Roll-over Kami-Shiho-Gatame Escape

Submissions 
 North–south choke
 Various Gi chokes

Included systems 
Systems:
Kodokan Judo, Judo Lists
Lists:
The Canon Of Judo
Judo technique

Similar techniques, variants, and aliases 
English aliases:
Broken upper four quarter hold down
Broken top four corner hold
Variants:
Sankaku gatame(三角固)
Similar:
Kami-Shiho-Gatame

References

External Media
 Technique video demonstration
 Technique illustration

External links
 Judoinfo.com

Judo technique